Khorgam District is a district (bakhsh) in Rudbar County, Gilan Province, Iran. At the 2006 census, its population was 10,465, in 2,993 families.  The District has one city: Barehsar. The District has two rural districts (dehestan): Dolfak Rural District and Khorgam Rural District.

References 

Rudbar County
Districts of Gilan Province